Ecto may refer to:

 Ecto, a medical prefix meaning outer or outside
 Ecto (album), by Happy Rhodes, 1987
 Ecto (software), a weblog client

See also
 
 Endo (disambiguation)
 Exo (disambiguation)
 Ectoderm, in biology, the outermost tissue layer
 Ectoplasm (cell biology), the outer part of the cytoplasm
 Ectotherm, in biology, a cold-blooded animal